Hebel (pronounced he-bell) is a rural town and locality in the Shire of Balonne, Queensland, Australia. It is on the border of Queensland and New South Wales.

Geography 
It is the eastern corner of the locality.

The Bokhara River (a non-perennial river) enters the locality from the east (Dirranbandi) and flows past the immediate north of the town and exits the locality to the south (Goodooga in New South Wales). It is part of the Murray-Darling River system.

In the west of the locality is the Culgoa River and the Culgoa Floodplain National Park, which extends into neighbouring Jobs Gate.

There are a number of homesteads in the locality:

 Balgi
 Ballandool
 Byra
 Currawillinghi
 Davirton
 Goonaroo
 Kinglebilla
 Koala
 Morley
 Tara
 Yattenbury

History 
Yuwaalaraay (also known as Yuwalyai, Euahlayi, Yuwaaliyaay, Gamilaraay, Kamilaroi, Yuwaaliyaayi) is an Australian Aboriginal language spoken on Yuwaalaraay country. The Yuwaalaraay language region includes the landscape within the local government boundaries of the Shire of Balonne, including the town of Dirranbandi as well as the border town of Hebel extending to Walgett and Collarenebri in New South Wales.

Yuwaalayaay (also known as Yuwalyai, Euahlayi, Yuwaaliyaay, Gamilaraay, Kamilaroi, Yuwaaliyaayi) is an Australian Aboriginal language spoken on Yuwaalayaay country. It is closely related to the Gamilaraay and Yuwaalaraay languages. The Yuwaalayaay language region includes the landscape within the local government boundaries of the Shire of Balonne, including the town of Dirranbandi as well as the border town of Goodooga extending to Walgett and the Narran Lakes in New South Wales.

The town was reputedly named after a German immigrant Noble Van Hebel. Hebel helped stage the coaches for Cobb and Co.

Curriwillinghi Post Office opened on 1 January 1864 (named after the Curriwillinghi pastoral station, which still exists as at 2020 at ).

In 1889, the Curriwillinghi Post Office was replaced by the Hebel Post Office.

In 1897 a dance hall was built. It is now the general store.

Hebel Provisional School  opened on 11 April 1901. On 1 January 1909, it became Hebel State School.

The Hebel Post office closed in 1989.

During 2020 and 2021, the Queensland border was closed due to the COVID-19 pandemic. Some border crossing points had Queensland Police checkpoints to confirm eligibility to enter Queensland, while other border crossing points were closed. At Hebel, there was a police border checkpoint on the Castlereagh Highway. The border crossing on the Hebel Goodooga Road was closed by the Balonne Shire Council building an earth wall across the road, although many local people doubted its effectiveness as a barrier to entry.

Hebel was the feature of ABC Back Roads Series 8, Episode 11; it was aired on 25 July 2022.

Facilities

Visitors to the village will find a general store, caravan park, hotel, and coffee shop.

Balonne Shire Council operates a library in William Street.

Education 
Hebel State School is a government primary (Prep-6) school for boys and girls in Maud Street. In 2015, it had an enrolment of eleven students with two teachers (one full-time equivalent) and five non-teaching staff (two full-time equivalent). In 2018, the school had an enrolment of seven students with one teacher and five non-teaching staff (2 full-time equivalent).

There is no secondary school in Hebel. The nearest secondary school is Dirranbandi State School (to Year 10) and St George State High School (to Year 12).

Transport 
There are a number of airstrips in the locality:

 Balgi airstrip
 Ballandool airstrip
Brenda airstrip
Byra airstrip
Davirton airstrip
Hebel airstrip

Amenities 
Hebel Community Hall is at 40-50 William Street.

Bokhara River Campground is a  site on James Street on the north side of town.

Hebel Racecourse is a  reserve west of Henry Street.

Hebel Cemetery is on the south-east edge of the town.

Attractions 
The front of the Hebel Hotel featured brightly-coloured art work by John Murray, which the interior furnishings are made of recycled items found in the bush.

The Hebel Historical Circle is a walk around the town illustrates places of historic interest.

The general store is also a cafe and restaurant; it retains its original dance floor.

Gallery

References

Further reading

External links 

 

Towns in Queensland
Shire of Balonne
Localities in Queensland